Gol Cheshmeh is a village in Shahidabad Rural District, Central District, Avaj County, Qazvin Province, Iran. At the 2006 census, its population was 114, in 31 families.

References 

Populated places in Avaj County